Fondation Lorin is an art museum located on the Rue Es-Siaghine in Tangier, Morocco. It was named as one of the oldest synagogues in the city. It is located near  the Place du 9 Avril 1947 and Mendoubia Gardens. Since 1994, it is housed in an old synagogue, and displays items such as newspapers, photographs, posters and plans related to the political, sporting, musical and social history of Tangier since the 1930s. It also has a number of contemporary paintings, and exhibitions are regularly held at the Fondation Lorin.

References

Buildings and structures in Tangier
Museums in Morocco
Tourist attractions in Tangier
Museums established in 1930
1930 establishments in Morocco
20th-century architecture in Morocco